Lo que el tiempo nos dejó is a 2010 Argentine TV miniseries of six telefilms about key events of the History of Argentina during the 20th century. They were produced by historian Felipe Pigna. The viewpoint of the stories is not on the events themselves, but on regular people related to them.

Episodes

See also
 Cultural depictions of Eva Perón

References

2010s Argentine television series
2010 Argentine television series debuts
Argentine television miniseries